"G.I. Jive" is a 1944 song written and originally performed by Johnny Mercer.

Background
Mercer intended to write a song that the soldiers would like, and the song was the biggest hit of all the songs dealing with soldier life during World War II.

Chart performance
The single was a hit twice in 1944 by two different performers: Johnny Mercer hit number one on the Harlem Hit Parade for one week and peaked at number thirteen on the pop charts. Three months later, Louis Jordan, also made it to number one on both the Harlem Hit Parade and the pop chart with "G.I. Jive". The B-side to Jordan's version, "Is You Is or Is You Ain't My Baby", was also a successful release.

Other versions
Louis Jordan and his Tympany Five recorded “G.I. Jive” for Decca in 1944 (the B-side being “Is You Is Or Is You Ain’t My Baby?”)
Deana Martin recorded "G.I. Jive" on her 2013 album Destination Moon.
Phil Harris sang a version on the June 4, 1944 episode of The Jack Benny Program.

References

Related topic
 GI Jive AFRS radio program by the same name

1944 songs
1944 singles
Louis Jordan songs
Songs of World War II
Songs with lyrics by Johnny Mercer
Songs written by Johnny Mercer